Maysville is a town in Jones County, North Carolina, United States. The population was 1,019 at the 2010 census. It is part of the New Bern, North Carolina Metropolitan Statistical Area. This town was home to former MLB left fielder Louie Meadows.

Etymology
Maysville derives its name from an early settler.

Geography
Maysville is located in southeastern Jones County at  (34.904581, -77.228969). U.S. Route 17 passes through the center of town, leading north  to New Bern and southwest  to Jacksonville. North Carolina Highway 58 leads southeast from Maysville  to Emerald Isle on the Atlantic coast.

It is bordered to the east by Croatan National Forest. The White Oak River runs past the southern end of town.

Demographics

2020 census

As of the 2020 United States census, there were 818 people, 401 households, and 263 families residing in the town.

2000 census
At the 2000 census, there were 1,002 people, 389 households and 255 families residing in the town. The population density was 1,326.8 per square mile (509.0/km). There were 483 housing units at an average density of 639.6 per square mile (245.4/km). The racial makeup of the town was 40.82% White, 55.89% African American, 0.30% Native American, 0.30% Asian, 0.30% Pacific Islander, 1.40% from other races, and 1.00% from two or more races. Hispanic or Latino of any race were 2.20% of the population.

There were 389 households, of which 34.4% had children under the age of 18 living with them, 39.3% were married couples living together, 20.3% had a female householder with no husband present and 34.2% were non-families. 29.8% of all households were made up of individuals, and 12.6% had someone living alone who was 65 years of age or older. The average household size was 2.58 and the average family size was 3.20.

30.1% of the population were under the age of 18, 6.9% from 18 to 24, 28.7% from 25 to 44, 19.7% from 45 to 64, and 14.6% who were 65 years of age or older. The median age was 35 years. For every 100 females, there were 96.9 males. For every 100 females age 18 and over, there were 88.7 males.

The median household income was $27,750 and the median family income was $34,688. Males had a median income of $30,104 and females $19,048. The per capita income was $11,119. About 19.9% of families and 26.2% of the population were below the poverty line, including 31.1% of those under age 18 and 20.0% of those age 65 or over.

Education
 Maysville Elementary School

References

External links
Town of Maysville official website

Towns in Jones County, North Carolina
Towns in North Carolina
New Bern micropolitan area